Forever Young is a 1992 American fantasy romantic drama film directed by Steve Miner and starring Mel Gibson, Elijah Wood, and Jamie Lee Curtis. The screenplay was written by Jeffrey Abrams from an original story named "The Rest of Daniel".

Plot
In 1939, Captain Daniel McCormick is a United States Army Air Corps test pilot. After a successful run and subsequent crash landing in a prototype North American B-25 Mitchell bomber at Alexander Field in Northern California, McCormick is greeted by his longtime friend, scientist Harry Finley. Finley confides that his latest experiment, "Project B", has succeeded in building a prototype chamber for cryonic freezing. The following day, just as McCormick is about to propose to his girlfriend, Helen, she goes into a coma following an automobile accident, with doctors doubting she will ever recover. McCormick insists he be put into suspended animation for one year, so he will not have to watch Helen die.

Fifty-three years later in 1992, ten-year-old airplane-enthusiast Nat Cooper and his friend Felix are playing inside the military storage warehouse housing the chamber, accidentally activating it and waking McCormick, leaving Nat’s coat behind. McCormick awakens and escapes before realizing what year it is. He first approaches the military about his experiences, but they dismiss him as crazed; McCormick becomes more determined to learn what happened to him.

McCormick follows the address on the jacket back to Nat, befriending him. While hiding in Nat's treehouse, he rescues Nat’s mother Claire from her abusive ex-boyfriend Fred, slightly injuring his hand in the process. Claire fixes up his wound and a bond develops between the two; she allows McCormick to stay, and he and Nat later build a simulated bomber-plane cockpit in Nat's treehouse so that McCormick can teach Nat how to fly. McCormick passes out and is hospitalized, where he discovers his body is failing as his age begins to catch up to him.

McCormick tracks down Finley’s daughter Susan, who informs him her father died in a fire before she was born. She gives McCormick her father’s journals, detailing the cryogenic process, and Finley's notes disclose that the rapid aging is irreversible. Susan also reveals that Helen is still alive, but they escape before the FBI, who is now after McCormick, catch up to them.

Claire drives McCormick to an air show and commandeers a B-25 bomber to fly to Helen's seaside-lighthouse home, with Nat stowing away on board. Claire gives Harry’s journals to the FBI, for their plans to replicate and modernize the experiment. McCormick suffers another ageing attack, forcing Nat (who is now slightly familiar with the plane's controls after his simulated-training session with McCormick) to land the plane in the field near Helen’s house. The now-elderly McCormick reunites with the also-gray-and-wrinkled Helen and asks her to marry him; she happily accepts, proving that true love does indeed last forever. McCormick introduces Nat to Helen, and the film ends with the three joining hands and going for a seaside stroll together.

Cast

Gibson described the script as having "a real innocence and charm" and had praised Abrams's previous script, which was made in to the film Regarding Henry. Gibson originally wanted the lead role, which eventually went to Harrison Ford, and insisted on seeing his next film script.

Production
In November 1990, Warner Bros. purchased the film rights to "The Rest of Daniel" for $2 million, the most ever paid for a screenplay. Ostensibly purchased as a star vehicle for Gibson, he turned down the opportunity to direct the feature.

A North American B-25J Mitchell known as "Photo Fanny" (from the Planes of Fame Museum in Chino, California) is featured prominently in the film, both as the B-25 prototype and later as the restored warbird McCormick flies to his beloved.

Initial film shooting started in February 1992 through to April 1992. Film producers were reluctant to release too much information about the film to the media, particularly the ending, while photograph releases to print media were limited. Among various locations used included on location in Mendocino County, where shooting took place from March 29 to April 2. A purpose-built set was built at the Stornetta Ranch, near the lighthouse in Point Arena. Although the film made use of real rain for some exterior scenes, artificial rainmakers were also utilized to maintain a consistency in downpours for the cameras.

Curtis had never met Gibson prior to working with him on the film. During an interview, she notes the cast members would frequently play pranks on each other but that "it was a fun set, this was the fun place to be." It was the first film where Curtis had played a mother. Gibson had to spent 2 hours each day to have the latex aging make-up applied to make him appear as an 80-year-old.

In the scene where Wood sings You Are My Sunshine to the girl in the tree house, it was originally going to be a different song which according to director Steve Miner, would have been very expensive to use, whereas the song used in the film was already freely available in the public domain. The film was completed for around $20 million.

Reception
Critically, Forever Young met with mixed reviews. The review aggregator website Rotten Tomatoes reported that 54% of critics have given the film a positive review based on 24 reviews, with an average rating of 5.4/10.
Audiences surveyed by CinemaScore gave the film a grade of "A−" on scale of A+ to F.

Roger Ebert noted, "[Forever Young] is not one of the most inspired (of the time travel movies), even though it has its heart in the right place." 

Box Office characterized it as "gooey sentiment and melodrama", playing on Gibson's name. 

Rita Kempley from the Washington Post dismissed the film as "A pablum of schmaltz and science fiction ..." 

Neill Caldwell from The Dispatch described the movie as "an old-school romantic comedy" that was "oh-so-predictable at times", while praising Wood and Gorman as delivering the best performances, suggesting that "the kids practically carry the movie." 

Laura Ustaszewski, writing for The Marion Star, praised the movie's acting and its strong supporting cast, noting that the film did not require special effects or explosions to be a "winner".

Box office
Despite the lukewarm reviews, mostly focused on the script, the film did well with audiences, and took in $127,956,187 worldwide. Forever Young opened to a first weekend gross of $5,609,875 and went on to gross $55,956,187 in the domestic market. It grossed approximately $72,000,000 in the foreign market. A Hollywood premiere was turned into a fund-raiser for two of Gibson's charities, the West Hollywood Alcohol and Drug Recovery Center and the Santa Monica Homeless Drop-in Center. A total of $70,000 was raised for both charities.

See also
 Cryostasis
 Idiocracy
 Late for Dinner
 The Philadelphia Experiment

References

Bibliography

 Clarkson, Wensley. Mel Gibson: Man on a Mission. London: John Blake, 2004. .
 McCarty, John. The Films of Mel Gibson. New York: Citadel, 2001. .

External links
 
 
 
 

1992 films
1990s science fiction adventure films
1992 romantic drama films
American science fiction adventure films
American romantic drama films
1990s English-language films
American aviation films
1990s romantic fantasy films
Films about ageing
Films about domestic violence
Cryonics in fiction
Films directed by Steve Miner
Films produced by Bruce Davey
Films scored by Jerry Goldsmith
Icon Productions films
Warner Bros. films
Films with screenplays by J. J. Abrams
Films set in 1939
Films set in 1992
1990s American films